Johannes de Galonifontibus was a Dominican friar who was nominated Bishop of Nakhchivān in the South Caucasus in March 1377. In August 1398, Johannes was made Archbishop of Sultaniya, hence his other name, Jean of Sultaniya.

In 1402, after his victory over the Ottoman Turks at the Battle of Ankara, Timur sent Johannes on an embassy to European courts, namely, Venice, Genoa, London and Paris, to announce his victory. Timur proposed treaties to facilitate commercial exchanges between European powers and his realm. Henry IV of England and Charles VI of France replied by congratulating Timur.

After his mission, Johannes returned to Sultaniya, until he was transferred to the Crimea in 1423.

See also
Timurid relations with Europe

Notes

Members of the Dominican Order
History of Nakhchivan
14th-century Roman Catholic archbishops in the Middle East
15th-century Roman Catholic archbishops in the Middle East
Dominican bishops